The Rock Falls Bridge is a historic structure located in Rock Falls, in the north-central part of the U.S. state of Iowa. The Iowa State Highway Commission prepared the plans for this bridge in September 1928, and they were revised in February 1929. While they designed riveted steel trusses for medium-span bridges in rural areas, they used concrete open spandrel arches like this one for several urban and small town structures in the 1920s. C.A. Holvik of Mason City was awarded the contract to construct the bridge, which they completed later in 1929. It was listed on the National Register of Historic Places in 1998.

See also
 
 
 
 
 List of bridges on the National Register of Historic Places in Iowa
 National Register of Historic Places listings in Cerro Gordo County, Iowa

References

Bridges completed in 1929
Arch bridges in Iowa
Bridges in Cerro Gordo County, Iowa
National Register of Historic Places in Cerro Gordo County, Iowa
Road bridges on the National Register of Historic Places in Iowa
Concrete bridges in the United States